Gazar Darreh or Gezer Darreh or Gezar Darreh or Gozar Darreh or Gozar Dareh may refer to:
 Gazar Darreh, Kalatrazan, Sanandaj County